Winter Dyke or winterdyke or winter-dyke  is a Scots word for a clothes horse used in drying clothing indoors.  The word "dyke" means a wall or a fence made without mortar that was occasionally used for hanging laundry in the summer months. Hence the winter dyke used specifically for the colder weather months.

The phrase winter dyke originally hails from the Ferguslie Park area of Scotland as a replacement for a back door drying area in the winter months.

See also
Bleaching field
Tenterground

References

Scottish words and phrases
Laundry drying equipment